DataMirror Corporation, founded in 1993, is a computer software company based in Markham, Ontario, Canada with offices in several countries.  The company provides real-time data integration, protection, and Java database products, and in 2006 claimed to have over 2100 business customers in industries including healthcare, retail, telecommunications, and financial services. As of 2007, the company is a wholly owned subsidiary of the IBM Corporation.

History
 1993 - DataMirror was founded
 1996 - DataMirror had its initial public offering
 1997 - DataMirror acquired SQLPump from SoftQuest Corp.
 1998 - DataMirror acquired mpc-Software GmbH, a software distributor located in Frankfurt, Germany
 2000 - DataMirror purchased assets of Constellar Corp, makers of Constellar Hub
 2001 - DataMirror acquired BDI Systems, Inc. which builds bi-directional, Java-based, data transformation software that exchanges data between XML, relational database and text formats.
 2003 - DataMirror completed acquisition of PointBase, makers of a Java database
 2003 - DataMirror acquired assets of bankrupt SmartSales, maker of sales force automation products
 2004 - DataMirror divested interest in Idion Technology Holdings, of South Africa
 2007 - On 16 Jul 2007, IBM purchased all of the outstanding DataMirror common shares at a price of C$27.00 per common share payable in cash, amounting to total consideration of approximately C$170 million (approximately US$161 million).
 2007 - 04 Sept 2007, IBM (NYSE: IBM) announced it had completed its acquisition of DataMirror.
 2012 - 04 Jan 2012, IBM (NYSE: IBM) announced it had completed its sale of its iCluster software business to Rocket Software, a privately held company based in Waltham, MA. iCluster software was originally acquired by IBM when it acquired DataMirror Corporation in 2007.

Products
 Transformation Server - Real-time bi-directional replication for loading a data warehouse, synchronizing data between existing systems and Web applications, or distributing data between different applications for decision-making
 iCluster - aims to ensure high availability of business applications and provide disaster avoidance and protection for IBM i systems
 LiveAudit - provides an audit trail of data changes aimed at reducing fraud, improving customer service and accountability, ensuring compliance with industry regulations, and managing and protecting data assets
 iReflect - provides a consistent, updated view of information by distributing and consolidating data in real-time between Oracle databases 
 Transformation Server/Event Server – detects events as they occur in production applications and creates business information to feed into the message queues of several enterprise application integration (EAI), business process management (BPM) and service-oriented architecture (SOA) environments	
 PointBase - a SQL92/99 JDBC-compliant Java relational database.

See also
 List of mergers and acquisitions by IBM

External links
 DataMirror company page

References

Software companies of Canada
Companies based in Markham, Ontario
IBM acquisitions
Companies established in 1993